Otham Feed is a minor,  long river (brook) and drainage ditch of the Pevensey Levels in the civil parish of Westham, Wealden District of East Sussex, England. It gives rise to Otham Court Ditch.

Course 
It then flows easterly for another , before finally giving rise to Otham Court Ditch.

References 

Rivers of East Sussex
Rivers of the Pevensey Levels